The Belfonte School District is a school district based in Muldrow, Oklahoma, United States. It contains two schools, Bell Elementary School and Belfonte Elementary School, that serve Kindergarten-Grade 8.

See also
List of school districts in Oklahoma

References

External links
 Belfonte School District
 Belfonte Overview

School districts in Oklahoma
Education in Sequoyah County, Oklahoma